Mohit Mahipal Sharma (born 18 September 1988) is an Indian international cricketer. He also plays for Haryana. He is a right-arm fast-medium bowler.

Domestic and IPL career
Following his work with pace bowling coach Ian Pont, Sharma picked up 37 wickets from 7 games at an average of 23 in the 2012–13 Ranji Trophy. He was then contracted by the IPL franchise Chennai Super Kings for the 2013 season. He played 15 matches in 2013 Indian Premier League and took 23 wickets.

In December 2018, he was bought by the Chennai Super Kings in the player auction for the 2019 Indian Premier League for 5 crores. He was released by the Chennai Super Kings ahead of the 2020 IPL auction. In the 2020 IPL auction, he was bought by the Delhi Capitals ahead of the 2020 Indian Premier League.

On March 26, 2022, Mohit was roped in by the new franchise Gujarat Titans as a net bowler for the IPL 2022 season.

International career
Sharma made his international debut for India in 4th ODI against Zimbabwe during India's tour of Zimbabwe. Sharma bowled an economical spell (2/26 in 10 overs) and took his first wicket in his fourth over dismissing Zimbabwe opening batsman Sikandar Raza. Sharma became the second Indian after Sandeep Patil to be adjudged man of the match on ODI debut.

References

External links 

 Mohit Sharma's profile page on Wisden

Living people
1988 births
People from Ballabhgarh
Indian cricketers
Haryana cricketers
India One Day International cricketers
India Twenty20 International cricketers
Chennai Super Kings cricketers
Cricketers at the 2015 Cricket World Cup
Punjab Kings cricketers
India Blue cricketers
Delhi Capitals cricketers